V433 Aurigae is a variable star in the constellation Auriga. It is a slowly pulsating B star (SPB) that ranges from apparent magnitude 6.02 to 6.06 over 4.6 days.

References

Auriga (constellation)
037367
026606
B-type main-sequence stars
Aurigae, V433
1924
Slowly pulsating B stars
Durchmusterung objects